Jasna Diklić (born March 8, 1946) is a Bosnian theatre and film actress. She was born in Sarajevo. Her mother was also an actress and a puppeteer. Diklić's first theatre experiences began at MESS Festival's experimental theatre studio, after which she proceeded to study acting  at the Department of Performing Arts in Sarajevo.

She was first engaged professionally by Banja Luka's National Theatre in 1969. Shortly thereafter, she was hired by a small Sarajevo theatre presently known as Kamerni Teatar 55.

She has appeared in over 150 theatre and film roles. She has won a number of awards for her roles and is one of the founders of The Sarajevo War Theatre.

In 2017, she has signed the Declaration on the Common Language of the Croats, Serbs, Bosniaks and Montenegrins.

Filmography
 Kriza (TV series) 
 Shanghai Gypsy
 Lud, zbunjen, normalan (TV series)
 Belvedere
 As If I Am Not There
 Krv nije voda (TV series)
 Pecat (TV series)
 Ritam zivota
 Duhovi Sarajeva
 Viza za budućnost (TV series)
 Skies Above the Landscape
 Well Tempered Corpses
 Crna hronika (TV series)
 Viza za buducnost: Novogodisnji special (TV movie)
 Fuse
 Remake
 Viza za buducnost: Novogodisnji special (TV movie)
 Strijelac (TV movie)
 The Perfect Circle
 Sarajevske price (TV series)
 Zagubljen govor (TV series)
 I Ada
 Brisani prostor (TV series)
 Vatrogasac (TV movie)
 Rascereceni (TV movie)
 Shepherd
 Udji, ako hoces

References

External links
 

Living people
20th-century Bosnia and Herzegovina actresses
Actresses from Sarajevo
1946 births
21st-century Bosnia and Herzegovina actresses
Bosnia and Herzegovina film actresses
Bosnia and Herzegovina stage actresses
Signatories of the Declaration on the Common Language